The following is a list of universities and colleges in Chongqing, China.

References
List of Chinese Higher Education Institutions — Ministry of Education
List of Chinese universities, including official links
Chongqing Institutions Admitting International Students

Chongqing
Chongqing-related lists